A list of wavelet related transforms:

 Continuous wavelet transform (CWT)
 Discrete wavelet transform (DWT)
 Multiresolution analysis (MRA)
 Lifting scheme
 Binomial QMF (BQMF)
 Fast wavelet transform (FWT)
 Complex wavelet transform
 Non or undecimated wavelet transform, the downsampling is omitted
 Newland transform, an orthonormal basis of wavelets is formed from appropriately constructed top-hat filters in frequency space
 Wavelet packet decomposition (WPD), detail coefficients are decomposed and a variable tree can be formed
 Stationary wavelet transform (SWT), no downsampling and the filters at each level are different
 e-decimated discrete wavelet transform, depends on if the even or odd coefficients are selected in the downsampling
 Second generation wavelet transform (SGWT), filters and wavelets are not created in the frequency domain
 Dual-tree complex wavelet transform (DTCWT), two trees are used for decomposion to produce the real and complex coefficients
 WITS: Where Is The Starlet, a collection of a hundredth of wavelet names in -let and associated multiscale, directional, geometric, representations, from activelets to x-lets through bandelets, chirplets, contourlets, curvelets, noiselets, wedgelets ...

Transforms
Wavelet-related transforms